PK-69 Peshawar-I is a constituency for the Khyber Pakhtunkhwa Assembly of the Khyber Pakhtunkhwa province of Pakistan.

Election results

2018
the following show results of election 2018

2013
The following table shows the names of candidates, their parties and the votes they secured in the general elections held on May 11, 2013.

2008

See also
 PK-68 Khyber-III
 PK-70 Peshawar-II

References

External links 
 Khyber Pakhtunkhwa Assembly's official website
 Election Commission of Pakistan's official website
 Awaztoday.com Search Result
 Election Commission Pakistan Search Result

Khyber Pakhtunkhwa Assembly constituencies